Cille Choirill is a 15th-century Roman Catholic church situated in Glen Spean in Lochaber, Scotland. Dedicated to St Kerrill, (also called "Cyril"), it was possibly built by Cameron of Lochiel.

A probable reference to the church occurs in a papal supplication dated June 1466 when a priest asked for provision to the parish church of Lochaber and its chapel of 'Querelo'. After lying roofless for some time, it was repaired in 1932/33 with financial support from Nova Scotian descendants of Lochaber emigrants.

Situated in the Roman Catholic parish of St Margaret's, and the former civil parish of Kilmonivaig, it is used for mass once per month during the summer months.

The Gaelic poets Iain Lom and Dòmhnall Mac Fhionnlaigh nan Dàn are buried in the churchyard.

References

Lochaber
Roman Catholic churches in Scotland
Churches in Highland (council area)
Category B listed buildings in Highland (council area)
Listed churches in Scotland